Trade globalization is a type of economic globalization and a measure (economic indicator) of economic integration. On a national scale, it loosely represents the proportion of all production that crosses the boundaries of a country, as well as the number of jobs in that country dependent upon external trade. On a global scale, it represents the proportion of all world production that is used for imports and exports between countries.

 For an individual country, trade globalization is measured as the proportion of that country's total volume of trade to its Gross Domestic Product (GDP):

 For the world as a whole, trade globalization is the share of total world trade in total world production (GDP), where the sums are taken over all countries:

Definition

Preyer and Brös provide a simple operationalization of trade globalization as "the proportion of all world production that crosses international boundaries". Chase-Dunn et al. note that trade globalization is one of the types of economic globalization, and define trade globalization as "the extent to which the long-distance and global exchange of commodities has increased (or decreased) relative to the exchange of commodities within national societies", and precisely operationalize it as "the sum of all international exports as a percentage of the global product, which is the sum of all the national gross domestic products (GDPs)." Erreygers and Vermeire define trade globalization as "the degree of dissimilarity between the actual distribution of bilateral trade flows and their gravity benchmark, determined only by size and distance." They note that trade globalization would be maximized in a situation where only size and distance affected the intensity of bilateral trade flows - in other words, in a situation where neither trade barriers nor other factors would matter.

Salvatore Babones notes that trade globalization is the indicator of a country's level of globalization most commonly used in empirical literature. Data for most countries in the modern era are available from the World Bank World Development Indicators database.

Trend

Chase-Dunn et al. note that there have been cyclical waves of trade globalization, with declines corresponding to wars and economic depressions, and that there has been a steady trend over the centuries for trade globalization to increase. With regards to the modern age, trade globalization increased until 1880, then decreased until 1905, increased again until 1914, decreased during World War I, increased until 1929, decreased until the end of World War II, and has been growing steadily since. They note that the main explanatory factors in this trend are the continued decline in transportation and communication costs, and stability provided by the "hegemonic system" supportive of trade in recent world-systems. Decreases can be explained by wars, and periods of conflict and tension often leading to them, where international actors cannot reach consensus on trade agreements and usually give in to protectionism.

See also
 Global financial system
 International marketing
 International trade
 Internationalization
 List of economic communities
 List of free trade agreements

References

External links
 Chase-Dunn, Christopher, and Shoon Lio, "Global Class Formation and the New Global Left in World Historical Perspective"
 Chase-Dunn, Christopher, and Roy Kwon, "Crises and Counter-Movements in World Evolutionary Perspective". Contains graphs of trade globalization for 1860-2008
 Appendix to "Trade Globalization since 1795: waves of integration in the world-system"

History of international trade
Economic globalization
Global economic indicators
Economic integration